Ekaterina Perova (born 24 October 1985) is a Russian slalom canoeist who has competed at the international level since 2003.

She won a bronze medal in the K1 team event at the 2019 ICF Canoe Slalom World Championships in La Seu d'Urgell.

Her older sister Aleksandra is also a slalom canoeist.

References

External links

Living people
Russian female canoeists
1985 births
Medalists at the ICF Canoe Slalom World Championships